David or Dave Caldwell may refer to:
 David Caldwell (American football executive) (born 1974), American football scout and executive
 David Caldwell (athlete) (1891–1953), American Olympic runner
 David Caldwell (footballer, born 1932) (1932–2017), Scottish footballer (Aberdeen FC)
 David Caldwell (footballer, born 1960), Scottish footballer (Mansfield Town)
 David Caldwell (North Carolina minister) (1725–1824), minister, statesman and soldier living in Guilford County, North Carolina
 David Caldwell (nose tackle) (born 1965), former American football nose tackle
 David Caldwell (safety) (born 1987), American football safety
 David Caldwell (tennis) (born 1974), American tennis player
 David D. Caldwell (1870–1953), philatelist